Inês Henriques (born 1 May 1980) is a Portuguese race walker. Internationally, she has won bronze medals at the 2010 IAAF World Race Walking Cup and the 2010 Ibero-American Championships in Athletics. She represented Portugal at the 2004 Summer Olympics and the 2012 Summer Olympics and has competed at the World Championships in Athletics on eight occasions from 2001 to 2017.

She won at the Chihuahua City meeting of the 2012 IAAF World Race Walking Challenge in March.

In 2017, in London, she won the gold medal in the 50km walk event, held for the first time during the World Championships in Athletics.  With her time of 4:05:56, she also set the world record for the event.

International competitions

Awards

References

External links

1980 births
Living people
People from Santarém, Portugal
Portuguese female racewalkers
Olympic athletes of Portugal
Athletes (track and field) at the 2004 Summer Olympics
Athletes (track and field) at the 2012 Summer Olympics
Athletes (track and field) at the 2016 Summer Olympics
World Athletics Championships athletes for Portugal
World Athletics Championships medalists
World Athletics Championships winners
World record setters in athletics (track and field)
Golden Globes (Portugal) winners
Sportspeople from Santarém District